Harwich Port may refer to:

 Harwich Port, Massachusetts, a beach resort in the U.S. state of Massachusetts
 Harwich International Port, a North Sea seaport in Essex, England